Thrive New Zealand, formerly called the Unified New Zealand Party, was a small political party in New Zealand.  The party was founded in 2012 by David Ding, a marketing manager.

On 7 November 2012 the party applied to register a logo with the Electoral Commission. The party subsequently changed its name to Thrive New Zealand and registered a substitute logo. As Unified New Zealand, the party opposed asset sales and foreign ownership and supported economic self-sufficiency a return to the gold standard. Following its name change, the party focused strongly on direct democracy and binding citizens-initiated referendums.

The party never stood any candidates for parliament. By January 2017, their website was defunct.

References

External links

 Official website (archived page)

Political parties in New Zealand
Political parties established in 2012
2012 establishments in New Zealand